Yannick Forestier (born 2 January 1982) is a French rugby union player. His position is Prop and he currently plays for Castres Olympique in the Top 14.

Honours

Club 
 Castres
Top 14: 2012–13

References

1982 births
Living people
French rugby union players
People from Narbonne
Castres Olympique players
Rugby union props
France international rugby union players
Sportspeople from Aude
RC Narbonne players
SC Albi players
US Colomiers players